William Warren "Bill" Phillips (born March 18, 1979) is a French-American former basketball player. He is the son of William and Dominique Phillips, who both played professional basketball in France. His mother is French, while father is American. He played as a power forward.

External links
Bill Phillips profile 
Bill Phillips profile

1979 births
Living people
American expatriate basketball people in Germany
American expatriate basketball people in Italy
American expatriate basketball people in Spain
American men's basketball players
Basket Livorno players
CB Breogán players
CB Granada players
French expatriate basketball people in Spain
French expatriate basketball people in Germany
French men's basketball players
French people of American descent
Giessen 46ers players
Liga ACB players
Maroussi B.C. players
Paris Racing Basket players
Pistoia Basket 2000 players
Power forwards (basketball)
Saint Joseph's Hawks men's basketball players
Saski Baskonia players
Sportspeople from Nice
William & Mary Tribe men's basketball players